Sir Ellis Kadoorie CBE (1865–1922) was a Jewish entrepreneur and philanthropist. He was a member of the wealthy Baghdadian Kadoorie family that had large business interests in the Far East. His brother was Sir Elly Kadoorie, and his nephew was Lawrence Kadoorie. His family were originally Iraqi Jews from Baghdad who later migrated to Bombay, British Raj India in the mid-eighteenth century.

Ellis Kadoorie arrived in Shanghai from Bombay in 1880 as an employee of the Iraqi Jewish firm David Sassoon & Sons. Within a few years he had accumulated large sums of money and had gone into business on his own account, with companies in both Shanghai and Hong Kong. Over the next two decades, the Kadoorie brothers made their fortunes, achieving success in banking, rubber plantations, electric power utilities and real estate, and gaining a major share-holding in Hong Kong Hotels Limited.

Biography and knighthood 
Sir Ellis was knighted in 1917. His Iraqi Jewish father moved to British Raj India before Ellis immigrated to Hong Kong.

Schools 
In the 1910s, Sir Ellis founded several schools in China, among them are Sir Ellis Kadoorie School in Hong Kong, and Shanghai Yucai High School.

Death 

Sir Ellis died and was buried in Hong Kong on 24 February 1922.  He is buried in the Jewish Cemetery.

According to his testament, he left £100,000 for the development of education in Palestine. There was great rejoicing in the Zionist Organization; naturally, everyone assumed the money was intended for Jewish education. Herbert Samuel set up a committee to plan how the money would be spent. Only some time later was Kadoorie's will read carefully, and then it turned out that the beneficiary was not specifically the British administration in Palestine, but the British government in London; Kadoorie had granted it the choice of whether to invest in Palestine or Iraq. There was no indication in his will that the money was intended to be used for Hebrew education. In the ensuing commotion, Weizmann managed at least to obtain a decision that the sum be invested in Palestine.

Eventually it was decided to build two separate agricultural schools in Palestine – The Kadoorie Agricultural High School which was built in the Lower Galilee for the Jewish population, and another, now known as Palestine Technical University – Kadoorie, in Tulkarm for the Arabs.

Sir Ellis Kadoorie School is a primary school in Hong Kong founded in 1891 (as The Ellis Kadoorie School for Indians) and added a secondary school in 1980.

See also
Kadoorie family
Sir Ellis Kadoorie Secondary School (West Kowloon)

References

External links

1865 births
1922 deaths
Commanders of the Order of the British Empire
Hong Kong chief executives
Hong Kong Jews
Hong Kong people of Iraqi-Jewish descent
Hong Kong philanthropists
Hong Kong real estate businesspeople
Iraqi Jews
Jewish philanthropists
Ellis
Baghdadi Jews